Francesco Maria Piave (18 May 18105 March 1876) was an Italian opera librettist who was born in Murano in the lagoon of Venice, during the brief Napoleonic Kingdom of Italy.

Career
Piave's career spanned over twenty years working with many of the significant composers of his day, including  Giovanni Pacini (four librettos), Saverio Mercadante (at least one), Federico Ricci, and even one for Michael Balfe.  He is most well known as Giuseppe Verdi's librettist, for whom he was to write 10 librettos, the most well-known being those for Rigoletto and La traviata.

But Piave was not only a librettist: he was a journalist and translator in addition to being the resident poet and stage manager at La Fenice in Venice where he first encountered Verdi. Later, Verdi was helpful in securing him the same position at La Scala in Milan. His expertise as a stage manager and his tact as a negotiator served Verdi very well, but the composer bullied him mercilessly for his pains over many years.

Like Verdi, Piave was an ardent Italian patriot, and in 1848, during Milan's  "Cinque Giornate," when Radetzky's Austrian troops retreated from the city, Verdi wrote to Piave in Venice addressing him as "Citizen Piave."

Together, they worked on ten operas between 1844 and 1862, and Piave would have also prepared the libretto for Aida when Verdi accepted the commission for it in 1870, had he not suffered a stroke which left him paralyzed and unable to speak. Verdi helped to support his wife and daughter, proposing that "an album of pieces by famous composers be compiled and sold for Piave's benefit".  The composer paid for his funeral when he died nine years later in Milan aged 65 and arranged for his burial at the Monumental Cemetery.

Piave's librettos for Verdi
From the beginnings of their working relationship in 1844, scholars such as Gabriele Baldini see Verdi's overall influence upon the structure of his work take a big leap forward when he notes: 
Working with Piave was Verdi's first opportunity to work with himself. [...] The composer completely dominates and enslaves the librettist, who becomes scarcely more than an instrument in his hands...[Piave's] libretti are in fact those best suited to Verdi's music [....] simply because, in detail as well as in general shape, Verdi himself composed them.

This statement suggests that, almost for the first time, the composer was going to be the one who determined "that drama essentially consisted of the arrangement of pieces and the clarity of the musical forms..[so that]..he began to become aware of the structure and architecture of musical composition, something which was not even clearly hinted at during the period with Solera. The composer began to control the overall dramatic arc of the drama and no longer would he "suffer under" such librettists as Temistocle Solera, who wrote the libretti for five Verdi operas  beginning with Oberto and up to Attila in 1846.

An example of the pressure which Verdi exerted on Piave was in the struggle to have the Venetian censors  approve Rigoletto: "Turn Venice upside down to make the censors permit this subject" he demanded, following that up with the admonition not to allow the matter to drag on: "If I were the poet I would be very, very concerned, all the more because you would be greatly responsible if by chance (may the Devil not make it happen) they should not allow this drama [to be staged]"
 
Nonetheless, another Verdi scholar notes that "Verdi always harried him unmercifully, often having his work revised by others [as in the case of Simon Boccanegra] [but] Piave rewarded him with doglike devotion, and the two remained on terms of sincere friendship." Piave became "someone Verdi loved".

In following Salvadore Cammarano as Verdi's main mid-career librettist, Piave firstly wrote Ernani in 1844,  and then I due Foscari (1844), Attila (1846), Macbeth (the 1847 first version), Il Corsaro (1848), Stiffelio (1850), Rigoletto (1851), La traviata (1853), Simon Boccanegra (the 1857 first version), Aroldo (1857), La forza del destino (the 1862 first version), and Macbeth (the 1865 second version).

Librettos by Piave

Filmography
, directed by Vincenzo Sorelli (1938)
, directed by Carmine Gallone (1946)
, directed by Carmine Gallone (1947)
The Force of Destiny, directed by Carmine Gallone (1950)
Rigoletto e la sua tragedia, directed by Flavio Calzavara (1956)
, directed by Mario Lanfranchi (1968)
Rigoletto, directed by Jean-Pierre Ponnelle (1982)
La Traviata, directed by Franco Zeffirelli (1983)
Macbeth, directed by Claude d'Anna (1987)
Giuseppe Verdi's Rigoletto Story, directed by Gianfranco Fozzi (2005)

References

Notes

Sources
Baldini, Gabriele (1970), (trans. Roger Parker, 1980), The Story of Giuseppe Verdi: Oberto to Un Ballo in Maschera. Cambridge, et al: Cambridge University Press.  
Black, John (1998),  "Piave, Francesco Maria" in Stanley Sadie, (Ed.),  The New Grove Dictionary of Opera, Vol. Three, pp. 999. London: Macmillan Publishers, Inc.   
Budden, Julian (1996), Verdi. New York: Schirmer Books (Master Musicians Series).    
Kimball, David (2001), in Holden, Amanda (Ed.), The New Penguin Opera Guide, New York: Penguin Putnam, 2001. 
O'Grady, Deidre (2000), Piave, Boito, Pirandello: From Romantic Realism to Modernism (Studies in Italian Literature). Edwin Mellon Press.   
Phillips-Matz, Mary Jane (1993), Verdi: A Biography, London & New York: Oxford University Press. 
Werfel, Franz and Stefan, Paul (1973), Verdi: The Man and His Letters, New York: Vienna House.

External links
 

1810 births
1876 deaths
Musicians from the Metropolitan City of Venice
Giuseppe Verdi
Italian journalists
Italian male journalists
Italian translators
Burials at the Cimitero Monumentale di Milano
Italian opera librettists
Italian male writers
19th-century journalists
19th-century translators
People from Murano